Arthur (Damascus Field) Aerodrome  is located  north northeast of Arthur, Ontario, Canada.

See also
List of airports in the Arthur area

References

Registered aerodromes in Wellington County, Ontario